Yanomaman, also as Yanomam, Yanomáman, Yamomámi, and Yanomamana  (also Shamatari, Shirianan), is a family of languages spoken by about 20,000 Yanomami people in southern Venezuela and northwestern Brazil (Roraima, Amazonas).

Subdivision

Ferreira et al. (2019)
Ferreira, Machado & Senra (2019) divide the Yanomaman family into two branches, with six languages in total.

 Ninam-Yanomam-Yaroamë
Nimam
Ninam (also known as Yanami, Yanami-Ninami) - 900 speakers in Venezuela and Brazil
Yanomam-Yaroamë
Yanomám (also known as Waiká) - 6,000 speakers mainly in Venezuela
Yanomamö (also known as Yanomame, Yanomami) - 20,000 speakers mainly in Brazil
Yaroamë (also known as Jawari) - 400 speakers in Brazil
Yãnoma - 178 speakers in Brazil
Sanumá
Sanumá (also known as Tsanuma, Sanima) - 5,100 speakers mainly in Venezuela

Sanumá is the most lexically distinct. Yanomamö has the most speakers (20,000), while Yãnoma has the fewest (178).

Jolkesky (2016)
Internal classification by Jolkesky (2016):

(† = extinct)

Yanomami
Sanuma
Yanam
Yanomami, Central
Yaroame
Yanomam, Yanomamï

Genetic relations
Yanomaman is usually not connected with any other language family. Joseph Greenberg has suggested a relationship between Yanomaman and Macro-Chibchan. Migliazza (1985) has suggested a connection with Panoan and Chibchan. Neither proposal is widely accepted.

Language contact
Jolkesky (2016) notes that there are lexical similarities with the Irantxe, Taruma, Katukina-Katawixi, Puinave-Kak, Tupi, Arawa, Guahibo, and Jivaro language families due to contact.

Name
Yanomami is not what the Yanomami call themselves and is instead a word in their language meaning "man" or "human being".  The American anthropologist Napoleon Chagnon adopted this term in the correct transcription Ya̧nomamö of its pronunciation to use as an exonym to refer to the culture and, by extension, the people. The word is correctly pronounced with nasalisation of all the vowels. As the phoneme indicated by the spelling 'ö' does not occur in English, variations in spelling and pronunciation of the name have developed, with Yanomami, Yanomamö, Ya̧nomamö, and Yanomama all being used. Some anthropologists have used the spelling Yanomamɨ to indicate what they feel is a more correct indication of the pronunciation with the vowel , but because many presses and typesetters eliminate the diacritical marks, the incorrect pronunciation /i/ and spelling of the name with ⟨i⟩ has emerged.

Characteristics

Phonology
Yanomaman languages have a phonological distinction between oral and nasal vowels. There are seven basic vowel qualities: /a e i o u ɨ ə/, which can occur as oral or nasal sounds.

In the table above, the practical orthography is shown in angle brackets below the phoneme, if different.

The Yanomaman languages present extensive nasal harmony. When in Yanomaman words, a vowel is phonetically nasalized, all vowels that follow within the same word are also nasalized. The consonants of Yanomama are shown in the table below:

Syntax
Yanomaman languages are SOV, suffixing, predominantly head-marking with elements of dependent-marking. Its typology is highly polysynthetic. Adjectival concepts are expressed by means of stative verbs, there are no true adjectives. Adjectival stative verbs follow their noun.

There are five demonstratives which have to be chosen according to distance from speaker and hearer and also according to visibility, a feature shared by many native Brazilian languages such as Tupian ones including Old Tupi. Demonstratives, numerals, classifiers and quantifiers precede the head noun.

There is a distinction between alienable and inalienable possession, again a common areal feature, and a rich system of verbal classifiers, almost a hundred, they are obligatory and appear just before the verb root. The distinction between inclusive and exclusive 1st person plural, a feature shared by most Native American languages, has been lost in Yanam and Yanomam dialects, but retained in the others.

Yanomami morphosyntactic alignment is ergative–absolutive, which means that the subject of an intransitive verb is marked the same way as the object of a transitive verb, while the subject of transitive verb is marked differently. The ergative case marker is -ny. The verb agrees with both subject and object.

Evidentiality on Yanomami dialect is marked on the verb and has four levels: eyewitness, deduced, reported, and assumed. Other dialects have fewer levels.

The object of the verb can be incorporated into it, especially if it not in focus:

Non-incorporated:

Incorporated:

Relative clauses are formed by adding a relativizing ('REL' below) suffix to the verb:

Sanuma dialect also has a relative pronoun ĩ.

Vocabulary
Loukotka (1968) lists the following basic vocabulary items for Yanomaman language varieties.

References

Bibliography
 Aikhenvald, Alexandra Y. & Dixon R.M.W. (1999) The Amazonian Languages Cambridge Language Surveys (p. 341-351)
 Campbell, Lyle. (1997). American Indian languages: The historical linguistics of Native America. New York: Oxford University Press. .
 Greenberg, Joseph H. (1960). General classification of Central and South American languages. In A. Wallace (Ed.), Men and cultures: Fifth international congress of anthropological and ethnological sciences (1956) (pp. 791–794). Philadelphia: University of Pennsylvania Press.
 Greenberg, Joseph H. (1987). Language in the Americas. Stanford: Stanford University Press.
 Kaufman, Terrence. (1990). Language history in South America: What we know and how to know more. In D. L. Payne (Ed.), Amazonian linguistics: Studies in lowland South American languages (pp. 13–67). Austin: University of Texas Press. .
 Kaufman, Terrence. (1994). The native languages of South America. In C. Mosley & R. E. Asher (Eds.), Atlas of the world's languages (pp. 46–76). London: Routledge.
Mattei-Müller, M. (2007). Lengua y cultura yanomami: diccionario ilustrado yanomami-español, español-yanomami. Caracas: CONAC.
Migliazza, E. C. (1972). Yanomama grammar and intelligibility. Indiana University. (Doctoral dissertation).
 Migliazza, Ernest C. (1985). Languages of the Orinoco-Amazon region: Current status. In H. E. Manelis Klein & L. R. Stark (Eds.), South American Indian languages: Retrospect and prospect (pp. 17–139). Austin: University of Texas Press.
 Migliazza, Ernest C.; & Campbell, Lyle. (1988). Panorama general de las lenguas indígenas en América. Historia general de América (Vol. 10). Caracas: Instituto Panamericano de Geografía e Historia.

Dictionaries 
 Müller, Marie-Claude Mattei. (2007) Diccionario ilustrado yanomami-español / español-yanomami. Caracas: Epsilon Libros. 782pp.

External links
 
 ELAR archive of Documentation and Description of the Yanomama of Papiu
 The Yanomami Language
 Yanomámi (Intercontinental Dictionary Series)

 
Language families
Polysynthetic languages
Indigenous languages of Northern Amazonia